Angel Wings is a 2016 television series starring Alyssa Chia.

Plot
The story tells the story of a young girl who in the face of adversity, never gives up.

Cast
 Alyssa Chia as Zhao Min Na 
 Qiu Xin Zhi as Duan An Qi 
 Wang Yi Zhe 
 Vin Zhang 
 Chang Cheng
 Zhang Yujian

2016 Chinese television series debuts
Chinese romance television series
Shenchuan Television original programming
Television series by Youhug Media